The Greek Catholic Church in Hungary or Byzantine Catholic Church in Hungary is a metropolitan sui iuris ("autonomous") Eastern Catholic particular church in full communion with the Catholic Church. It is headquartered in Debrecen. Its liturgical usage is that of the Byzantine Rite in the Hungarian language.

History
Hungary's Greek Catholics were originally concentrated in what is now northeastern Hungary. This region was historically inhabited by Byzantine Rite Christians from the Carpathian Mountains (Ruthenians and Romanians). Serbs fleeing the Turkish advance arrived later in what was then Hungary, but most stayed in the area that is now part of Serbia. Later still, when the Turks were driven back from Vienna in 1683 and from Buda and central Hungary in 1686, Ruthenians and Slovaks settled in the abandoned lands of Hungary. They were cared for by the Ruthenian Eparchy of Mukacheve (Hungarian: Munkács). In the 17-18th centuries, during the conflict with Protestants, many Hungarians joined the Greek Catholic Church, and so adopted the Byzantine Rite rather than the Latin, which resulted in a considerable increase in their number.

Perhaps largely because of this last element, Byzantine Hungarians began to use the Hungarian language in their liturgy. A translation of the Liturgy of Saint John Chrysostom for private study was published in 1795. A book containing the parts of the liturgy that the people sing appeared in 1862. Representatives of 58 Hungarian-speaking parishes met in 1868 and set up an organization to promote the liturgical use of the Hungarian language and the establishment of a separate eparchy. 1882 saw the publication, without formal ecclesiastical approval, of a Hungarian translation of the Liturgy of Saint John Chrysostom for actual use, which was soon followed by Hungarian translations of other liturgical texts.

Sui iuris
Finally, on 8 June 1912, Pope Pius X established the Eparchy of Hajdúdorog for the 162 Hungarian-speaking Greek Catholic parishes. He limited the use of Hungarian to non-liturgical functions, requiring the clergy to use Greek in the liturgy, but granted an interval of three years for the change of language to be effected. Because of the outbreak of the First World War, this interval was prolonged indefinitely, and use of Hungarian has continued.

The change of national frontiers after the First World War led to the reduction of the territory of the Eparchy of Hajdúdorog from the 168 parishes to which it had grown to only 90. Within Hungary there were also 21 parishes of the Eparchy of Prešov and one of the Eparchy of Mukačevo. On 4 June 1924, these were brought together as the new Exarchate of Miskolc, at first - because at that time they still used Church Slavonic in the liturgy - classified as Ruthenian, but now considered part of the Hungarian Greek Catholic Church.

The church was in a unique position under the Hungarian Communist regime. Unlike its counterparts in bordering Romania, Slovakia or Soviet Ukraine, it was neither outlawed nor especially targeted for persecution. Factors for this relative leniency include the church's small size, its poverty (northeast Hungary, where its adherents are concentrated, has historically been the country's poorest area) as well as the near absence of an Orthodox church into which Greek Catholics could have been forced to merge.

The territory of the eparchy at first corresponded to that of the Latin Church Archdiocese of Eger in eastern Hungary and Budapest. But its jurisdiction was extended on 17 July 1980 to the whole of Hungary.

On 20 March 2015, Pope Francis elevated the Hungarian Church to a Metropolitanate with Debrecen as its Metropolitan See, naming Bishop Fülöp Kocsis as its metropolitan. He also raised the Apostolic Exarchate of Miskolc to the status of an Eparchy, to be headed by Bishop Atanáz Orosz. Finally he erected the Eparchy of Nyiregyhaza from territory previously within the See of Hajdúdorog. The two eparchies are suffragans of the Hajdúdorog see.

A small number of Hungarian Greek Catholics have emigrated to North America, where their few parishes are aggregated, in the United States of America, to the Ruthenian Byzantine Metropolia, and, in Canada, to the Ukrainian eparchies. More than half of the diocesan priests are married.

Structure 
The Church comprises only a single ecclesiastical province, which consists of the Metropolitan Archeparchy (Archdiocese) and two suffragan Eparchies (dioceses):
Hungarian Greek Catholic Archeparchy of Hajdúdorog (the Metropolitan sui juris)
Hungarian Catholic Eparchy of Miskolc
Hungarian Greek Catholic Eparchy of Nyiregyhaza

Its bishops are members of the (mainly Latin) episcopal conference of Hungary.

See also
Catholic Church in Hungary

References

External links
 Official website
Byzantine Rite Catholics in Hungary - A Historical Retrospection
 Article on the Hungarian Greek Catholic Church by Ronald Roberson on the CNEWA web site

 
Eastern Catholicism in Hungary
1912 establishments in Austria-Hungary